Cheng Xingling (1900–1987) was a People's Republic of China politician. He was born in Liling, Hunan. He was a graduate of Peking University.

References

1900 births
1987 deaths
Chinese Communist Party politicians from Hunan
People's Republic of China politicians from Hunan
Vice-governors of Hunan
Members of the 2nd Chinese People's Political Consultative Conference
Members of the 5th Chinese People's Political Consultative Conference
Members of the Standing Committee of the 6th Chinese People's Political Consultative Conference
National University of Peking alumni
People from Liling
Politicians from Zhuzhou